The term air corps can generically refer to an air force.

In specific use, air corps or Air Corps may refer to:
 United States Army Air Corps, the predecessor of the United States Air Force
 Army Air Corps (United Kingdom), the air corps of the British Army
 Air Corps (Ireland), the air component of the Defence Forces of Ireland
 Philippine Army Air Corps, the former air corps of the Philippine Army
 Somali Air Corps, the former air corps of Somalia